Tajikistan will participate in the 2011 Asian Winter Games in Almaty and Astana, Kazakhstan from January 30, 2011 to February 6, 2011. The nation will send more than 1 athlete in 1 sport

Alpine skiing

Tajikistan will send 2 male alpine skiers.

Men

References

Nations at the 2011 Asian Winter Games
Asian Winter Games
Tajikistan at the Asian Winter Games